Kasia Haddad is a Scottish actress. She portrayed the role of Josie Jump for series 3 and 4 in the children's television programme Balamory (replacing Buki Akib) and Wendy in Doctors.

References

External links 
TV.com entry

Living people
20th-century British actresses
21st-century British actresses
Actresses from Edinburgh
British television actresses
Year of birth missing (living people)